Herbert Albrecht (18 January 1925 – 3 November 1997) was a German wrestler. He competed in the men's Greco-Roman light heavyweight at the 1960 Summer Olympics.

Personal life
Albrecht served in the Wehrmacht during the Second World War.

References

External links
 

1925 births
1997 deaths
German male sport wrestlers
Olympic wrestlers of the United Team of Germany
Wrestlers at the 1960 Summer Olympics
People from Suhl
German military personnel of World War II
Sportspeople from Thuringia
20th-century German people